The 2016 USASA National Women's Open was the 21st staging of the tournament, and the fourth under a new format that eliminates regional qualification.  The finals took place from July 14 to 17 with four teams, the first time since 2006 when no Women's Open participants played in either of the active level-two leagues.

The tournament was won by defending champions Olympic Club, giving the club its third USASA title in as many seasons.

Group play

Schedule

Standings

Final

References

2016
Open
United
Sports in Denver